7-Dehydrodesmosterol (or cholesta-5,7,24-trien-3-beta-ol) is a cholesterol intermediate.

References

Cholestanes